Daniel Correa Freitas (24 January 1994 – 27 October 2018), sometimes known as just Daniel, was a Brazilian professional footballer who played as an attacking midfielder.

Club career

Early career
Born in Juiz de Fora, Minas Gerais, Daniel Correa joined Cruzeiro's youth setup in 2007, aged 14. Released in 2013, he moved to Botafogo.

Botafogo
Daniel Correa made his Série A debut for Bota on 20 October 2013, coming on as a late substitute for Hyuri in a 2–2 draw against Vasco da Gama. He became a starter during the 2014 Campeonato Carioca, and scored his first goals on 10 May 2014, netting a hat-trick in a 6–0 home routing of Criciúma.

In September 2014, Daniel Correa suffered a knee injury which ended his season prematurely.

São Paulo
On 27 December 2014, despite being injured, Daniel Correa joined São Paulo on a three-year contract. He subsequently struggled with recurrent injuries, which limited his appearances for the club.

Daniel Correa was subsequently loaned to Coritiba, Ponte Preta and São Bento.

Death
On 27 October 2018, Daniel Correa was found dead in São José dos Pinhais, Paraná. It was later revealed that he was murdered after attending a party in the city. He had been beaten, partially beheaded, and his genitals were mutilated.

Edison Brittes Junior confessed to the killing, alleging that Daniel tried to rape his wife.

Career statistics

References

1994 births
2018 deaths
Brazilian footballers
Association football midfielders
Campeonato Brasileiro Série A players
Botafogo de Futebol e Regatas players
São Paulo FC players
Coritiba Foot Ball Club players
Associação Atlética Ponte Preta players
Esporte Clube São Bento players
People from Juiz de Fora
Deaths by stabbing in Brazil
Male murder victims
People murdered in Brazil
Brazilian murder victims
Sportspeople from Minas Gerais